Calga is a suburb of the Central Coast region of New South Wales, Australia, located  north of Sydney. It is part of the  local government area.

It is home to a major interchange on the Pacific Motorway, Old Pacific Highway, and the Australia Walkabout Wildlife Park.

History
Calga lies within the traditional lands of both the native Darkinjung and Kuringgai peoples and is an Aboriginal word meaning "the mouth". The locality's main feature is the state heritage-registered Aboriginal women's site, whose highlight includes the site of a sandstone amphitheatre.

Population
In the 2016 Census, there were 142 people in Calga. 78.0% of people were born in Australia and 85.5% of people spoke only English at home.

Heritage listings 
Calga has a number of heritage-listed sites, including: 
 Peats Ridge Road: Calga Aboriginal Cultural Landscape

References

Suburbs of the Central Coast (New South Wales)